The Women's Points Race is one of the 7 women's events at the 2007 UCI Track World Championship, heldo in Palma de Mallorca, Spain.

Ninetten cyclists from 19 countries participated in the contest. Because of the number of entries, there were no qualification rounds for this discipline. Consequently, the event was run direct to the final.

Final
The final and only race was run at 17:50 on April 1. The competition consisted on 100 laps, making a total of 25 km with 10 sprints.

Elapsed time=32:50.840
Average speed=45.665 km/h

References

Women's points race
UCI Track Cycling World Championships – Women's points race
UCI